Bingen is a municipality in the district of Sigmaringen in Baden-Württemberg in Germany.

Mayors
Jochen Fetzer was elected mayor in 2002. He was reelected in October 2010.

 Robert Daubenberger (CDU)
 1978–2002: Paul Mayer (CDU)
 since 2003: Jochen Fetzer (independent)

Points of interest

 Hornstein Castle Ruin, first noted in 1271, a former Reichsfestung. Between 1818 and 1869 the castle served as  an asylum and prison. It was partly demolished in 1879. The castle's chapel is still in good shape and used for religious ceremonies. It contains medieval altars by Magnus Hops.

Famous people
 Johann Schreck S.J. (* 1576 Bingen, † 1630 Beijing), also known as Terrentius Constantiensis, Deng Yuhan Hanpo, Deng Zhen Lohan, Jesuit, Missionary to China, botanist, astronomer

References

Sigmaringen (district)